Julius Jensen was a member of the Wisconsin State Assembly.

Biography
Jensen was born on January 10, 1872, in Denmark. He moved to Milwaukee, Wisconsin, in 1883.

Career
Jensen was elected to the Assembly in 1920 and 1924. Previously, he was a member of the Milwaukee County, Wisconsin Republican Committee.

References

Danish emigrants to the United States
Politicians from Milwaukee
Republican Party members of the Wisconsin State Assembly
1872 births
Year of death missing